Power Players is a CGI animated television series created by Jeremy Zag and developed by Man of Action. The series is produced by Zagtoon and Method Animation, in co-production with France Télévisions, Man of Action Studios, Planeta Group, WDR, WDR Mediagroup, and Kaibou, with the participation of Cartoon Network, Globosat, and Discovery Latin America.

The series premiered in the United States on September 21, 2019, on Cartoon Network. In March 2020, Power Players started airing reruns on Boomerang and Netflix.

Premise 
9-year-old boy Axel Mulligan fights evil living toy Madcap and his minions with the help of the titular heroic toy team, the Power Players. Axel is also able to become a toy himself using the Power Bandz, a device created by his uncle Andrew.

Characters

Main 
 Axel (voiced by Kieran Walton) - Andrew's nephew, who gains the ability to transform into an action figure after discovering the Power Bandz.
 Masko (voiced by Carlos Salazar) - A toy luchador whose arms, legs and head stretch and who wears various masks based on his emotions.
 Sarge Charge (voiced by Greg Chun) - A tough, grizzled toy soldier who is an expert in toy weapons.
 Bearbarian (voiced by Jamieson Price) - A powerful, yet sensitive plush bear who wields a toy sledgehammer nicknamed the “Worldbreaker".
 Bobby Blobby (voiced by Reba Buhr) - A small doll-like toy who pilots a purple mech suit that can fire clay.
 Galileo (voiced by Todd Haberkorn) - A blue lizard-like toy who is able to turn invisible.
 Slobot (voiced by Landon McDonald) - A robotic inventor who moves slowly, but is a valuable asset of the team.
 Zoe (voiced by Carolina Ravassa) - Axel's friend, who is the only human who knows Axel's secret.

Recurring 
 Andrew (voiced by Scott Whyte) - Axel's uncle, a brilliant toy inventor who created both Madcap and the Power Players.
 Luka (voiced by Aleks Le) - A friend of Axel.
 Cleo LeBall (voiced by Carolina Ravassa) - Zoe's competitive archenemy
 Joyride (Ronin in French) (voiced by Zach Aguilar) - A robotic tank-like toy who was brought to life by Madcap, but later betrayed him and became an ally to the Power Players.

Villains 
 Madcap (voiced by Paul Haapaniemi) - A villainous robotic toy who wants to drain the power of Axel's Power Bandz to conquer the world. He has the power to absorb and control Minergy and can use it to bring toys to life.
 Orangutank and Porcupunk (voiced by Steven T. Seagle and Scott Whyte respectively) - Two of Madcap's henchmen. Orangutank can fire energy disks from his back and arms, while Porcupunk can launch explosive missiles from his body.
 Princess Sugar Salt (voiced by Sona Movsesian) - One of Madcap's henchmen, a fairy-like toy who wields a wand that is able to create a giant hand and can use magic.
 Dynamo (voiced by Todd Haberkorn) - One of Madcap's henchmen, who has electromagnetic powers.
 Ice Crusher (voiced by Steven T. Seagle) - One of Madcap's henchmen, a hockey player toy who can control ice and has a Canadian accent.
 Dr. Nautilus (voiced by Richard Horvitz) - One of Madcap's henchmen, a mutant cephalopod toy with one eye and four stretchable arms who resides in the sewers. He is able to generate both acid and sentient eyeball creatures.
 Pyrant (voiced by Neil Kaplan) - One of Madcap's henchmen, a pyramid toy who can answer any question and has mind-control powers.

Development and production
The show was originally greenlit in 2016 under the working title Power Toys before being renamed Power Players.

On February 11, 2019, the series was officially picked up by Cartoon Network, making it the first Zagtoon production to be made and produced for this channel, and Playmates became the toy licenser. Power Players premiered on Cartoon Network UK on February 3, 2020.

Episodes

Home media
In 2021, Shout! Factory Kids signed a deal with ZAG Heroez to secure the North American DVD rights to Power Players. Other media companies that will produce home media include Koch Media in Italy, LEONINE in Germany, and Dazzler Media in the United Kingdom.

References

External links
 

2019 American television series debuts
2020 American television series endings
2019 French television series debuts
2020 French television series endings
2010s American animated television series
2020s American animated television series
2010s French animated television series
2020s French animated television series
American children's animated action television series
American children's animated adventure television series
American children's animated comic science fiction television series
American children's animated superhero television series
French children's animated action television series
French children's animated adventure television series
French children's animated comic science fiction television series
French children's animated superhero television series
Anime-influenced Western animated television series
French-language television shows
English-language television shows
Man of Action Studios
American computer-animated television series
French computer-animated television series
Sentient toys in fiction
Animated television series about children
Television series by Method Animation